This article lists events that occurred during 1976 in Estonia.

Incumbents

Events
8 August – Letipea massacre.
25 October – Osmussaar earthquake.

Births

Deaths

References

 
1970s in Estonia
Estonia
Estonia
Years of the 20th century in Estonia